Vitali Luchanok (born 29 February 1992) is a Belarusian figure skater who competed in men's singles. He placed 23rd at the 2011 World Junior Championships.

Programs

Competitive highlights

References

External links 

 

1992 births
Belarusian male single skaters
Living people
People from Smalyavichy
Sportspeople from Minsk Region
20th-century Belarusian people
21st-century Belarusian people